Synuchus testaceus is a species of ground beetle in the subfamily Harpalinae. It was described by Jedlicka in 1940.

References

Synuchus
Beetles described in 1940